Salinda Dissanayake (1 May 1958 – 5 August 2019) was a Sri Lankan politician. He was member of Parliament from Kurunegala District and Sri Lankan Non-Cabinet Minister of Nation Building.

References

External links
 

1958 births
2019 deaths
Sinhalese engineers
Sri Lankan Buddhists
Members of the 10th Parliament of Sri Lanka
Members of the 11th Parliament of Sri Lanka
Members of the 12th Parliament of Sri Lanka
Members of the 13th Parliament of Sri Lanka
Members of the 14th Parliament of Sri Lanka
Government ministers of Sri Lanka
Sri Lanka Freedom Party politicians
United People's Freedom Alliance politicians